La Palabra (Spanish for The Word) may refer to:

 La Palabra (musician), Cuban  bandleader, singer-songwriter, pianist, record producer, and arranger
 "La Palabra", an episode on The West Wing (season 6)
 La Palabra 1490, former radio station in Austin, Texas, now KJFK

See also
 Museo de la Palabra y la Imagen, located in San Salvador, El Salvador
 Las palabras de Max, 1978 Spanish film
 La tercera palabra, 1955 Mexican film